Heather Knight may refer to:
Heather Knight (cricketer) (born 1990), English cricketer
Heather Knight (educator), American educator
Heather Knight (archaeologist)